Behind Your Smile is a 2016 Taiwanese television series created and produced by Sanlih E-Television, starring Marcus Chang, Eugenie Liu, Sean Lee, Hongshi and Esther Yang. Filming began on October 15, 2016 and wrapped up on March 15, 2017. It aired on TTV every Sunday at 10:00 pm starting November 13, 2016.

Synopsis
Zhao Yiting lives a cold and meaningless life as he tries to pursue the only goal he knows: destroying the person who took everything from him. As he lost his father because of Lin Man, he decides to take revenge on her. At the same time, Lin Man's daughter, Lei Xinyu, returns home to surprise her mother, but the woman has fled due to numerous charges against her. Xinyu is now destitute and has an angry mob after her, so Yiting helps her while harboring ulterior motives. However, since Xinyu is naive, gentle and kind, Yiting starts to get conflicted about his feelings for her.

Cast

Main cast
Marcus Chang as Zhao Yiting
Eugenie Liu as Lei Xinyu
Liao Lingyi as child Xinyu
Sean Lee as Zhong Qianren
Hongshi as Tang Qianni
Esther Yang as Jian Xiaoyue

Supporting cast
Lin Jiawei as Chen Shihuan
Kelly Ko as Lin Man
Jian Chang as Tang Ansheng
Chen Tingxuan as Pan Yunan
Jian Yizhe as Lin Taishu
Andrew Liu as Xu Shufan
Gail Lin as Zhong Jialing, Qianren's mother
Phil Yan as Su Zhongwen

Guest actors
Wei Yicheng as Xiao Zhou (episodes 1–2)
Lin Shien as owner (episode 1)
Xue Hao as Xiao Fang (episode 1)
Ye Huizhi as housekeeper (episode 2)
Chen Wanhao as Li Taiqing (episode 2, 11)
Candy Yang as Wu Shanhong (episode 3, 10, 16)
Yin Zhongmin as prosecutor (episode 3)
Luo Qihong as Yan Yuan (episode 3, 6–7)
Tong Yijun as human trafficker and smuggler (episode 3)
Ceng Zhengzhan as Council Member Luo (episode 4–6)
Lan Weihua as Zhao Jian'an (episode 5–6, 8)
Lan Zhongwen as bakery owner (episode 5)
Hope Lin as Qianren's blind date woman (episode 8)
You  Xiaobai as Xiaobai (episode 8)
?? as Xiang Ying (episode 8)
Wu Yun Ting as Yunan's college friend (episode 19)

Soundtrack

Behind Your Smile Original TV Soundtrack (OST) (浮士德的微笑 原聲帶) was released on December 30, 2016 by various artists under Rock Records. It contains 10 tracks total, in which 8 songs are various instrumental versions of the songs. The opening theme is track 1 "He Isn’t Worth It" by Shi Shi, while the closing theme is track 2 "Not Your Business" by 831.

Track listing

Songs not featured on the official soundtrack album.
 Don't Panic by Shi Shi
 Lost on The Way (迷些路) by Shi Shi feat. Matzka
 A Late Goodnight (很晚的晚安) by Shi Shi
 Revert (倒流) by Yisa Yu
 The Last Love Song (最後一首情歌) by Nine Chen
 The North Wind and the Sun (北風和太陽) by Alien Huang

Broadcast

Ratings
In the ratings below, the highest rating for the show will be in red, and the lowest rating for the show will be in blue.

Competing dramas on rival channels airing at the same time slot were:
CTV – Jealousy Incarnate
FTV – Abula, Laugh For 24 Hours, Love God Karaoke, Long Vacation
EBC – The King of Romance

References

External links
 Behind Your Smile TTV website  
 Behind Your Smile SETTV website 
 

2016 Taiwanese television series debuts
2017 Taiwanese television series endings
Taiwan Television original programming
Sanlih E-Television original programming